The 1999 Pro Bowl was the NFL's all-star game for the 1998 season. The game was played on February 7, 1999, at Aloha Stadium in Honolulu. For the fourth time in the past five years, the AFC beat the NFC, doing so 23–10. Keyshawn Johnson of the New York Jets and Ty Law of the New England Patriots were the game's MVPs. This game was also the last game in the careers of Denver Broncos quarterback John Elway and of Detroit Lions running back Barry Sanders. The referee was Dick Hantak.

AFC

Quarterbacks
John Elway – Denver Broncos
Doug Flutie – Buffalo Bills
Vinny Testaverde – New York Jets

Running backs
Terrell Davis – Denver Broncos
Marshall Faulk – Indianapolis Colts
Sam Gash – Buffalo Bills
Eddie George – Tennessee Oilers
Curtis Martin – New York Jets

Wide receivers
Keyshawn Johnson – New York Jets
Jermaine Lewis – Baltimore Ravens
Ed McCaffrey – Denver Broncos
Eric Moulds – Buffalo Bills
Jimmy Smith – Jacksonville Jaguars

Tight ends
Ben Coates – New England Patriots
Shannon Sharpe – Denver Broncos

Offensive linemen
Tony Boselli – Jacksonville Jaguars
Ruben Brown – Buffalo Bills
Dermontti Dawson – Pittsburgh Steelers
Tony Jones – Denver Broncos
Bruce Matthews – Tennessee Titans
Tom Nalen – Denver Broncos
Jonathan Ogden – Baltimore Ravens
Mark Schlereth- Denver Broncos
Will Shields – Kansas City Chiefs

Defensive linemen
Tim Bowens – Miami Dolphins
Michael McCrary – Baltimore Ravens
Darrell Russell – Oakland Raiders
Michael Sinclair – Seattle Seahawks
Bruce Smith – Buffalo Bills
Ted Washington – Buffalo Bills
 Cortez Kennedy – Seattle Seahawks

Linebackers
Zach Thomas – Miami Dolphins
Chad Brown – Seattle Seahawks
Mo Lewis – New York Jets
Ray Lewis – Baltimore Ravens
Bill Romanowski – Denver Broncos
Junior Seau – San Diego Chargers

Defensive backs
Rodney Harrison – San Diego Chargers
Ty Law – New England Patriots
Aaron Glenn - New York Jets
Lawyer Milloy – New England Patriots
Shawn Springs – Seattle Seahawks
Sam Madison – Miami Dolphins
Steve Atwater – Denver Broncos
Charles Woodson – Oakland Raiders

Punter
Craig Hentrich – Tennessee Oilers

Kicker
Jason Elam - Denver Broncos

NFC

Quarterbacks
Chris Chandler – Atlanta Falcons
Randall Cunningham – Minnesota Vikings
Steve Young – San Francisco 49ers

Running backs
Mike Alstott – Tampa Bay Buccaneers
Jamal Anderson – Atlanta Falcons
Garrison Hearst – San Francisco 49ers
Barry Sanders – Detroit Lions
Emmitt Smith – Dallas Cowboys
Robert Smith – Minnesota Vikings

Wide receivers
Michael Bates – Carolina Panthers
Cris Carter – Minnesota Vikings
Antonio Freeman – Green Bay Packers
Randy Moss – Minnesota Vikings
Roell Preston – Green Bay Packers
Jerry Rice – San Francisco 49ers

Tight ends
Mark Chmura – Green Bay Packers
Wesley Walls – Carolina Panthers

Offensive linemen
Larry Allen – Dallas Cowboys
Jeff Christy – Minnesota Vikings
Kevin Gogan – San Francisco 49ers
Randall McDaniel – Minnesota Vikings
William Roaf – New Orleans Saints
Todd Steussie – Minnesota Vikings
Tony Mayberry – Tampa Bay Buccaneers
Nate Newton – Dallas Cowboys

Defensive linemen
Warren Sapp – Tampa Bay Buccaneers
Michael Strahan – New York Giants
John Randle – Minnesota Vikings
Kevin Carter – St. Louis Rams
Robert Porcher – Detroit Lions
Luther Ellis – Detroit Lions
Bryant Young – San Francisco 49ers

Linebackers
Jessie Armstead – New York Giants
Derrick Brooks – Tampa Bay Buccaneers
Ed McDaniel – Minnesota Vikings
Jessie Tuggle – Atlanta Falcons
Kevin Greene – Carolina Panthers
Winfred Tubbs- San Francisco 49ers

Defensive backs
Ray Buchanan – Atlanta Falcons
LeRoy Butler – Green Bay Packers
Eugene Robinson – Atlanta Falcons
Deion Sanders – Dallas Cowboys
Aeneas Williams – Arizona Cardinals
Darren Woodson – Dallas Cowboys

Punter
Mitch Berger – Minnesota Vikings

Kicker
Gary Anderson - Minnesota Vikings

References

External links
 1999 Pro Bowl at ProBowlOnline.com

Pro Bowl
Pro Bowl
Pro Bowl
Pro Bowl
Pro Bowl
American football competitions in Honolulu
February 1999 sports events in the United States